A sheath knife is a fixed-bladed knife that fits in a sheath of leather or other material such as nylon or kevlar. The sheath is used to protect the knife and as a carrier. Most importantly, the sheath protects the person carrying the knife (e.g. in the pocket or hanging on the belt) from potentially serious injuries that the sharp, unprotected blade could easily cause. To provide sufficient protection, sheaths made of soft materials, such as leather, often have reinforcements, inside or outside of the sheath, made of metal sheet or other suitable materials having sufficient strength.     

The blades vary in size, shape and construction.

In Australian law, "sheath knife" has a different definition. In this case, they are a type of non-folding, fixed-blade knife which has "a sheath which withdraws into its handle", thus giving something of the effect of an "out-the-front" flick knife. These knives, like flick knives, are classed as "prohibited weapons" in Australia.

 Pocket knife 
 Sliding knife

References
2.Torefy https://torefy.com/best-kitchen-knife-guards/

Knives
Fur trade